Mario Arroyo is a Gibraltarian poet and former school teacher. He is the author of  Profiles (1994), a series of bilingual meditations on love, loneliness and death. In 2009 he was described by the Spanish newspaper El Pais as 'un perfecto bilingue'. A study commissioned by the prestigious Spanish cultural body el Instituto Cervantes in 2005 remarked that Arroyo's poetry possessed "indudable inspiración en la experiencia vivida y en la realidad local, aunque a diferencia de otros escritores gibraltareños no cae en reductores localismos, sino que es capaz de dar una significación trascendente a sus reflexiones personales." Arroyo is also a noted dancer. In September 2015, Arroyo was awarded the Gibraltar Medallion of Honour for his contribution to the arts.

References

Year of birth missing (living people)
Living people
Gibraltarian writers
European poets
Male poets
Male dancers